Mourão is a municipality in the District of Évora in Portugal. The population in 2011 was 2,663, in an area of 278.63 km2.

Geography 
The municipality borders the municipality of Alandroal to the north, Spain to the east, Barrancos to the south-east, Moura to the south and Reguengos de Monsaraz to the east.

The town has the well-preserved Castle of Mourão.

Gallery

Politics 
The present Mayor is Maria Clara Safara, elected by the Socialist Party. The municipal holiday is February 2.

Parishes
Administratively, the municipality is divided into 3 civil parishes (freguesias):
 Granja
 Luz
 Mourão

Notable people 
 Hernâni Neves (born 1963) a retired Portuguese footballer and beach soccer player, known as Hernâni

See also
Granja Amareleja IPR

References

External links 
Mourão Municipality (Portugal)
Mourão Digital - A tua Comunidade na Internet

Municipalities of Évora District